The Grammicolepididae are a small family of deep-sea fishes, called tinselfishes due to their silvery color.

They are related to the dories, and have similar deeply compressed bodies.

They are rarely caught in trawls. Five have been caught south of the Bay of Biscay. One was caught off Scotland in 2004, and one off Co. Kerry, Ireland in December 2010 by Rossaveal trawler "Maria Magdelena III"

References
 
 {Irish Times 23 December 2010}

Grammicolepididae
Zeiformes